Jillian Louise Calland Duff (called Jill;  Worsley; born 1972) is a British Anglican bishop. Since 2018, she has been the Bishop of Lancaster, a suffragan bishop in the Diocese of Blackburn. Previously, she had been Director of St Mellitus College, North West, an Anglican theological college, from 2013 to 2018. Before ordination, she studied chemistry at university and worked in the oil industry. After ordination in the Church of England, she served in the Diocese of Liverpool in parish ministry, chaplaincy, and church planting.

Early life and education
Duff was born in 1972 in Bolton, Lancashire, England. She was educated at Bolton School, a private school in Bolton. She studied Natural Sciences at Christ's College, Cambridge, graduating with a Bachelor of Arts (BA) degree in 1993: as per tradition, her BA was promoted to a Master of Arts (MA Cantab) degree in 1997. She then studied chemistry at Worcester College, Oxford, completing her Doctor of Philosophy (DPhil) degree in 1996. Her doctoral thesis was titled "Investigations of redox-coupled proton transfer by iron-sulfur cluster systems in proteins". Her early career was spent working in the oil industry.

Ordained ministry
Duff trained for ordained ministry at Wycliffe Hall, Oxford, an evangelical Anglican theological college. She also studied theology during this time, and graduated from Wycliffe with a BA degree in 2002. She was ordained in the Church of England as a deacon in 2003 and as a priest in 2004.

From 2003 to 2005, Duff served her curacy at St Philip's Church, Litherland in the Diocese of Liverpool. In 2005, she was appointed the first pioneer minister in the Diocese of Liverpool. In that role, she was tasked with planting churches in Liverpool city centre to evangelise to the unchurched in their 20s and 30s. In 2009, she was additionally appointed chaplain to Liverpool College, then a private all-through school: she would continue this role part-time until 2016.

In 2011, Duff left her church planting role, and was appointed a vocations development advisor in the Diocese of Liverpool and an initial ministerial education (IME) tutor. In 2012, she liaised between St Mellitus College, an Anglican theological college in London, and the Church of England's north west dioceses (Blackburn, Carlisle, Chester, Liverpool, and Manchester) to create a new theological college in the North West of England. In March 2013, she was appointed the first director of St Mellitus College, North West. St Mellitus NW is the first full-time ordination course in the North West since St Aidan's College, Birkenhead was closed in 1969. She has additionally held Permission to Officiate in the Dioceses of Liverpool since 2013, of Chester since 2017, and Diocese of St Asaph since 2018.

Episcopal ministry
On 13 March 2018, Duff was announced as the next Bishop of Lancaster, a suffragan bishop in the Diocese of Blackburn.  She was consecrated a bishop by John Sentamu, Archbishop of York, on 29 June 2018 during a service at York Minster. She was installed as the eighth suffragan Bishop of Lancaster in July 2018 during a service at Blackburn Cathedral.

Views
Duff is an evangelical Anglican. She was involved in the Church of England's "Living in Love and Faith" (LLF); discussions relating to "matters of identity, sexuality, relationships and marriage". She was also involved in "The Beautiful Story", a film released by the Church of England Evangelical Council in response to LLF which championed the Church of England's traditional teaching on sex, sexuality and same-sex relationships. She holds an "orthodox position" on sex and marriage, which means that she is against same-sex marriage.

In 2023, following the news that the House of Bishop's of the Church of England was to introduce proposals for blessing same-sex relationships, she signed an open letter which stated:

Personal life
Duff is married to Jeremy Duff: he is an Anglican priest who is currently the Principal of St Padarn's Institute, a theological training initiative of the Church in Wales. He is also the author of a well known Greek textbook, “The Elements of New Testament Greek (3rd edition)”. Together they have two sons.

References

1972 births
Living people
Anglican bishops of Lancaster
Women Anglican bishops
21st-century English Anglican priests
British academic administrators
Women academic administrators
People from Bolton
People educated at Bolton School
Alumni of Christ's College, Cambridge
Alumni of Worcester College, Oxford
People in the petroleum industry
Alumni of Wycliffe Hall, Oxford
Evangelical Anglican bishops
Staff of St Mellitus College